The Royal College of Podiatry (RCPod) is the professional association and trade union for registered chiropodists and podiatrists in the United Kingdom.

Previously known as Society of Chiropodists and Podiatrists (SCP) it changed its name in 2018 to the College of Podiatry and in 2021 became the Royal College of Podiatry. The charitable subsidiary of the organisation is the College of Podiatry which was formed in 2012.

The union originated in 1912 as the Society of Chiropodists, the first organisation of chiropodists in Europe.  In 1916, it was renamed the Incorporated Society of Chiropodists, and in 1919, it established examinations for potential new members. Several rival organisations emerged: the Northern Association of Chiropodists, the Chelsea Chiropodists Association and the British Association of Chiropodists.  These merged with the Incorporated Society in 1945, the new body once more taking the name Society of Chiropodists. It was recognised as a negotiating body by the National Health Service in 1948, but did not register as a trade union until 1978.  In 1993, it became the Society of Chiropodists and Podiatrists, recognising the membership of podiatrists, and in 1997, it affiliated to the Trades Union Congress. In 1998, the Association of Chief Chiropody Officers and the Podiatry Association both merged with the society.

In 2021 The College of Podiatry has been renamed as the Royal College of Podiatry (RCPod) after being granted permission to use the title by Her Majesty The Queen.

Royal Patronage
Camilla, Queen Consort has been the society's Patron since 2005. The Queen Mum was previously patron from 1993, up until her death in 2002.

Trade Union Activities

The trade union arm of the Royal College is delivered by a network of local representatives and regionally based Employment Relations Officers.

The Royal College is a member of the TUC, the STUC, the WTUC and the Congress of Irish Trade Unions.

Martin Furlong represents the College of Podiatry on the General Council of the TUC

Katie Harwood represents the College of Podiatry on the Women’s Committee of the TUC

References

External links
Official website
Catalogue of the SCP archives, held at the Modern Records Centre, University of Warwick

Healthcare trade unions in the United Kingdom
Organisations based in the London Borough of Southwark
Podiatry organizations
Trade unions established in 1945
Trade unions affiliated with the Trades Union Congress